The House of Évreux was a cadet branch of the Capetian dynasty, the royal house of France, which flourished from the beginning of the 14th century to the mid 15th century. It became the royal house of the Kingdom of Navarre.

The House was founded by Louis, Count of Évreux. He was the third son of Philip III of France, by his second wife Marie of Brabant. His son and heir, Philip, was the husband of Joan II of Navarre and the first King of Navarre from the Évreux dynasty.

Louis' younger son Charles had no grandchildren. The Évreux dynasty ended with the death of Blanche I of Navarre, who died in 1441.

Notable members of the House of Évreux
 Jeanne d'Évreux, Queen of France as the third wife of Charles IV of France, whose failure to produce a son ended the House of Capet
 Philip III of Navarre
 Blanche d'Évreux, Queen of France as the second wife of Philip VI of France
 Charles II of Navarre
 Joan of Navarre, Queen of England as the second wife of Henry IV of England
 Charles III of Navarre
 Blanche I of Navarre

See also 
 List of Navarrese monarchs from the Capetian dynasty
 Navarre monarchs family tree

References 

 
1303 establishments in Europe
1300s establishments in France
1441 disestablishments
1440s disestablishments in Europe
Evreux